Hare and Hounds may refer to:
Paper Chase (game) (aka: Hare & Hounds), a running race game where a hare leaves a trail of paper to follow
Hare and Hounds (board game) (also known as the French Military Game), a simple deterministic strategy board game where three hounds attempt to trap a hare
Cambridge University Hare and Hounds, the cross-country running club of the University of Cambridge
Hare and Hounds (Sheen), pub in Sheen, London
Hare & Hounds, Kings Heath, pub in Kings Heath, Birmingham